Martin Stosch (born 30 July 1990) is a German singer and the runner-up of the fourth season of the television show Deutschland sucht den Superstar (DSDS), the German version of Pop Idol.

Biography

Personal life 
Stosch was born on 30 July 1990 in Landshut, West Germany. His parents are Bernhard Stosch and Elisabeth Stosch and he has two sisters, Sandra and Vanessa. Before the fourth season of DSDS he was to be on a school band, as very good guitarist. Today, he lives in Postau a small township in Lower Bavaria.

Deutschland sucht den Superstar 
In September 2006, he attended the show's casting in Munich and inspired the jury with his two songs "Tears in Heaven" by Eric Clapton and "Wake Me Up When September Ends" by Green Day. In the Top 20 shows he convinced the public to vote for him, as he sang the songs: "Home" by Michael Bublé and Westlife's cover of "Mandy". Stosch made it to the Top 10, only to be in the bottom group every week up to his elimination. However, Max Buskohl, who was a favorite to win the competition along with Mark Medlock, dropped out of the competition to sign a record contract with his band. Thus, Stosch returned to the show and made it to the finale against Medlock in which he became the runner up.

Performance at Deutschland sucht den Superstar

Discography

Album 
 7teen (18 April 2008)

Singles

Appearances 
 2007: Power of Love (joined release of all finale participants of DSDS)
 "If Tomorrow Never Comes"
 "If You Don't Know Me by Now" (Martin and the DSDS-Top-10)

Undisclosed 
 2007: I Can Reach Heaven From Here (Written by Jörgen Elofsson, however contain on the Album)

External links 

 Official Website 

Deutschland sucht den Superstar participants
Living people
1990 births
English-language singers from Germany
21st-century German  male singers